Sounine is a village on the northern coast of Tunisia, 60 km from the capital Tunis and 30 km from Bizerte. The village is split into two main parts: Sounine village and Sounine plage (the beach).

Sounine plage is characterized by a seaside with rocks. However, people can easily reach a sand beach by walking 20 minutes along the coast. The sand beach has been nicknamed Acapulco as it looks like its sister beach on the west coast of Mexico.

Populated places in Tunisia